The Stevens Building is located in the Bexar County city of San Antonio in the U.S. state of Texas.  Completed in 1891, architect James Riely Gordon designed the building for local businessman John J. Stevens. It is listed on the National Register of Historic Places listings in Bexar County, Texas. The structure was designated a Recorded Texas Historic Landmark in 1984.

Building
The three-story Richardsonian Romanesque Stevens Building at 315 E. Commerce was designed by architect James Riely Gordon for San Antonio businessman John J. Stevens and completed in 1891.  The Wagner & Chabot
bicycle wholesaler occupied the building for 45 years.  Bledsoe Furniture Company was a tenant for 33 years. The University of San Antonio held the lease on the entire third floor for more than half a century.

In 1979 a local hospital bought both the Stevens and the Staacke buildings with the intent of razing the structures to convert the property to a hospital parking lot. The San Antonio Conservation Society stepped in to preserve architectural history and purchased both buildings. In 1982, a group of investors bought and restored the two structures. The building's interior was remodeled for contemporary tenants.  Historic photographs were used to restore the exterior as authentically accurate to the original as possible. The facade is detailed with oriel windows, and brick and red granite, finished with carved limestone.

References

Buildings and structures in San Antonio
History of San Antonio
National Register of Historic Places in San Antonio
Recorded Texas Historic Landmarks
Commercial buildings completed in 1891
Richardsonian Romanesque architecture in Texas
Commercial buildings on the National Register of Historic Places in Texas